A Harbor Defense Command was a military organization of the United States Army Coast Artillery Corps designated in 1925 from predecessor organizations dating from circa 1895. It consisted of the forts, controlled underwater minefields, and other coastal defenses of a particular harbor or river. Harbor Defense Commands, along with the similar Coast Artillery Corps, were disestablished in 1950.

History
These commands originated as Artillery Districts, to control groups of forts constructed under the Endicott Program beginning in 1895. A 1909 reference shows that districts could include (depending on size) a Battle Command (later Fort Command), Fire Command, Mine Command, and Battery Commands. Mine planter vessels were also attached to these commands to plant and maintain controlled minefields. In 1913 the districts were redesignated as Coast Defense Commands, called "Coast Defenses of..." the area protected. At this time Coast Artillery Districts became regional commands, each controlling several Coast Defense Commands. Several of these commands were disarmed and disestablished between World War I and World War II, although minefield defenses may have been retained (references are unclear). Some of the disarmed commands were rearmed in World War II with "Panama mounts", circular concrete platforms for towed 155 mm guns. Some of these rearmed commands and other hastily-armed areas were designated as "Temporary Harbor Defenses". In 1925 the Coast Defense Commands were redesignated as Harbor Defense Commands, called "Harbor Defenses of..." the area protected. After World War II all of these commands were disarmed within a few years, and they and the Coast Artillery Corps were disestablished in 1950.

Harbor Defense Command areas

The major Harbor Defense Commands in the Continental United States (CONUS) were:

The major Harbor Defense Commands in US territories were:

The Harbor Defense Commands established as a result of the 1940 Destroyers for Bases Agreement with the United Kingdom were:

See also
 Seacoast defense in the United States
 List of coastal fortifications of the United States
 List of forts in the United States

References

 
 
 
 
 
 A Short History of US fort construction at the Coast Defense Study Group, Inc. website
 List of all US coastal forts and batteries at the Coast Defense Study Group, Inc. website

United States Army Coast Artillery Corps
Coastal fortifications
Fortifications in the United States
1925 establishments in the United States
20th-century military history of the United States
United States military-related lists